The premiership of Morarji Desai extended from 24 March 1977 to 15 July 1979. In the 1977 Indian general election Morarji Desai led the Janata Party to victory against the Congress party. Upon taking office, Morarji Desai became the first Indian Prime Minister not belonging to the Congress party.

Emergency and election victory

The Janata Party was formed by political leaders and activists of various political parties who had been united in opposing the state of emergency imposed in 1975 by then-Prime Minister Indira Gandhi. After elections were called in 1977, the Janata Party was formed from the union of the Congress (O), Swatantra Party, Socialist Party of India, Bharatiya Jana Sangh and the Lok Dal. Congress defector Jagjivan Ram, Hemvati Nandan Bahuguna & Nandini Satpathy formed the Congress for Democracy and joined the Janata alliance. The widespread unpopularity of Emergency rule gave Janata and its allied a landslide victory in the election.

Cabinet ministers 

|}

Pratap Chandra Chunder – Minister of Education
Shanti Bhushan – Minister of Law and Justice
Brij Lal Verma – Minister of Communications
Madhu Dandavate – Minister of the Railways
Raj Narain – Minister of Health
Hemvati Nandan Bahuguna – Minister of Petroleum
Ravindra Varma – Minister of Labour and Parliamentary affairs
Mohan Dharia – Minister of Commerce
Biju Patnaik
Purushottam Kaushik

Rabi Ray was inducted in January 1979 to fill in the vacancy caused by Raj Narain's exit.

Ministers of state 
Abha Maiti
Satish Chandra Agrawal
Krishana Kumar Goyal
Jagadambi Prasad Yadav
Renuka Devi Barkataki
Arif Beg
Ishaq Jamkhanawala
Samarendra Kundu - Minister of State, External Affairs
Ram Kinkar - Minister of State in the Ministry of Works and Housing and Supply and Rehabilitation

Reversal of Emergency decrees
The first actions taken by the Desai government were to formally end the state of emergency and media censorship and repeal the controversial executive decrees issued during the Emergency. The Constitution was amended to make it more difficult for any future government to declare a state of emergency; fundamental freedoms and the independence of India's judiciary was reaffirmed. The new government also proceeded to withdraw all charges against the 25 accused in the Baroda dynamite case, which included the new Minister of Industry, George Fernandes. The Minister of Railways reinstated the railway employees disciplined after the May 1974 strike. The Desai government proceeded to establish inquiry commissions and tribunals to investigate allegations of corruption and human rights abuses by members of Indira Gandhi's government, political party and the police forces. Specific inquiries were instituted on Sanjay Gandhi's management of the state-owned Maruti Udyog Ltd., the activities of the former Minister of Defence Bansi Lal and the 1971 Nagarwala scandal. Both Indira and her son Sanjay were charged with allegations of corruption and briefly arrested.

Economic policy

The Janata government had lesser success in achieving economic reforms. It launched the Sixth Five-Year Plan, aiming to boost agricultural production and rural industries. Seeking to promote economic self-reliance and indigenous industries, the government required multi-national corporations to go into partnership with Indian corporations. The policy proved controversial, diminishing foreign investment and led to the high-profile exit of corporations such as Coca-Cola and IBM from India. But the government was unable to address the issues of resurging inflation, fuel shortages, unemployment and poverty. The legalisation of strikes and re-empowerment of trade unions affected business efficiency and economic production.

The Janata government tried to curb forgery and black money in India by demonetising notes of 1000, 5000 and 10000 Rupees on 16 January 1978. Many decades later, in November 2016, Modi government decided to demonetise 500 and 1000 rupee notes in an effort to stop the counterfeiting of the current banknotes alleged to be used for funding terrorism in India and for cracking down on black money in the country.

References

Janata Party
 
1970s in India
Indian premierships
1977 establishments in India
1979 disestablishments in India
Shiromani Akali Dal